Fredy Perlman (20 August 1934 – 26 July 1985) was an American author, publisher, and activist. His best-known work, Against His-Story, Against Leviathan!, retells the historical rise of state domination through the Hobbesian metaphor of the Leviathan.

Early life 

Perlman was born August 20, 1934, in Brno, Czechoslovakia, to Henry and Martha Perlman. His family immigrated to the United States when he was young. Perlman received a master's degree from Columbia University and a PhD from University of Belgrade. He married Lorraine Nybakken in January 1958.

Professional life 

His best-known work, Against His-Story, Against Leviathan (1983) rewrites the history of humanity as a struggle of free people ("zeks") resisting the sovereign nation-state (Leviathan). The book influenced ecophilosopher John Zerzan. Philosopher John P. Clark states that Against His-Story, Against Leviathan! describes Perlman's critique of what he saw as "the millennia-long history of the assault of the technological megamachine on humanity and the Earth." Clark also notes the book discusses "anarchistic spiritual movements" such as the Yellow Turban movement in ancient China and the Brethren of the Free Spirit in medieval Europe.

In 1984 Perlman wrote a work on the subject of nationalism called The Continuing Appeal of Nationalism. In it he argues that "Leftist or revolutionary nationalists insist that their nationalism has nothing in common with the nationalism of fascists and national socialists, that theirs is a nationalism of the oppressed, that it offers personal as well as cultural liberation." And so "To challenge these claims, and to see them in a context," he asks "what nationalism is – not only the new revolutionary nationalism but also the old conservative one." And so he concludes that nationalism is an aid to capitalist control of nature and people regardless of its origin. Nationalism thus provides a form through which "Every oppressed population can become a nation, a photographic negative of the oppressor nation" and that "There's no earthly reason for the descendants of the persecuted to remain persecuted when nationalism offers them the prospect of becoming persecutors. Near and distant relatives of victims can become a racist nation-state; they can themselves herd other people into concentration camps, push other people around at will, perpetrate genocidal war against them, procure preliminary capital by expropriating them."

During 1985, Perlman wrote two essays on Nathaniel Hawthorne, whom Perlman regarded – along with Hawthorne's contemporaries Thoreau and Melville – as a critic of technology and
imperialism.

Personal life 

Perlman died on July 26, 1985, while undergoing heart surgery in Detroit's Ford Hospital. He was survived by his wife and a brother.

Selected publications 
 
 "Essay on Commodity Fetishism". Telos 6 (Fall 1970). New York: Telos Press.
 "The Continuing Appeal of Nationalism"
 Sound recording
 "The Reproduction of Daily Life"
 Against His-story! Against Leviathan!
 Worker-Student Action Committees, France May '68 with Roger Gregoire
 Manual for Revolutionary Leaders
 Manual for Revolutionary Leaders Second Edition Including The Sources of Velli's Thoughts (Black & Red, Detroit, 1974)
 "Ten Theses on the Proliferation of Egocrats"
 "Obituary for Paul Baran"
 "The Machine Against the Garden: Two Essays on American Literature and Culture"
 "Chicago, 1968"
 "Anything can happen"
 Illyria Street Commune 1979 (AudioPlay)
 Illyria Street Commune 1979 (Playscript on The Anarchist Library)

See also 
 Original Affluent Society
 Situationist International
 David Watson (anarchist)
 John Zerzan

References

Further reading 

 Having Little, Being Much: A Chronicle of Fredy Perlmans Fifty Years by Lorraine Perlman
 Max Cafard, "The Dragons of Brno: Fredy Perlman against History's Leviathan". Fifth Estate #347, Spring, 1996 Review of Fredy Perlman, Against His-Story, Against Leviathan
 l'Insécurité sociale, "No Compromise with Nationalism". Fifth Estate #325, Spring 1987. Translation of the introduction to the French edition of Fredy Perlman's The Continuing Appeal of Nationalism
 Artnoose, "Love & Letters of Insurgents". Fifth Estate #392, Fall/Winter, 2014 Review of Letters of Insurgents by Sophia Nachalo and Yarostan Vocheck, as told by Fredy Perlman
 Unruhlee, "Reading Letters of Insurgents 34 Years After its Publication". Fifth Estate #383 Summer 2010
 Carleton S. Gholz, "Fifth at 40 Detroit radical rag celebrates its ruby anniversary". Detroit Metro Times, August 10, 2005  Includes discussion of Fredy Perlman's contribution to Fifth Estate newspaper's history
 The Detroit Printing Co-op by Danielle Aubert.

External links 

 Black and Red Books, the press founded by the Perlmans
 Fredy Perlman texts at Libcom
 Fredy Perlman texts at Spunk Library
 Fredy Perlman texts at The Anarchist Library

1934 births
1985 deaths
20th-century American male writers
20th-century American non-fiction writers
20th-century translators
American anarchists
American anti-capitalists
American male non-fiction writers
American people of Czech-Jewish descent
Anarchist theorists
Anarchist writers
Anarcho-primitivists
Anti-consumerists
Bolivian emigrants to the United States
Columbia University alumni
Czechoslovak emigrants to Bolivia
French–English translators
Green anarchists
Industrial Workers of the World members
Jewish American writers
Jewish anarchists
People from Cochabamba
Scholars of nationalism
University of Belgrade Faculty of Law alumni
University of California, Los Angeles alumni
Western Michigan University faculty
Writers on antisemitism